The 70th Mechanized Infantry Brigade is a brigade of the Turkish Army based in the Southeastern Anatolia Region at the town of Kızıltepe in Mardin Province. It is part of the Army's 7th Corps based at Diyarbakir.

The brigade appears to be a descendant of the 70th Infantry Brigade, which in 1974, according to the reports of the British Defence Attache in Ankara, was based in Siirt and was part of 7th Corps. According to the same reports, at the time, 7th Corps comprised 70th Infantry Brigade alongside the 20th Mechanized Infantry Brigade at Urfa and the 16th Mechanized Infantry Brigade at Diyarbakır.

The brigade in Kızıltepe is headquartered at the Selen Barracks and consists of the 8th Mechanized Infantry Regiment, which has three border battalions in İdil, Nusaybin and Şenyurt at the Syrian border. In March 1983, the battalions were deployed to Nusaybin, and then were stationed in the districts of Mardin Province with the headquarters in Midyat.

7th Corps subunits
Kemalettin Eken previously commanded the corps many years ago.

On 8 August 2006, Hurriyet reported that a new tactical border Infantry Division was being established; a decision had been taken to form the 3rd Tactical Infantry Division in the district of Yuksekova.
Hurriyat noted that Hakkari is already the home to the Mountain Warfare Commando Brigade, the Provincial Gendarmerie Regimental Headquarters, the Yuksekova Brigade, the Semdinli Tactical Regimental Headquarters and the Cukurca Tactical Regimental Headquarters, and so it said that important changes were being undertaken at the headquarters in order to ensure that the units worked more effectively and with better coordination. Command of this newly formed division has been given to Maj Gen Yurdaer Olcan.

Units circa 2010:
3rd Tactical Infantry Division (Yüksekova)
34th Border Brigade (Şemdinli)
16th Mechanized Brigade (Diyarbakir)
20th Armored Brigade (Şanlıurfa)
70th Mechanized Infantry Brigade (Mardin)
8th Mechanized Infantry Regiment (Kızıltepe)
172nd Armored Brigade (Silopi)
2nd Motorized Infantry Brigade
6th Motorized Infantry Brigade (Akçay)
3rd Commando Brigade (Siirt)
107th Field Artillery Regiment (Siverek)
Hakkari Mountain and Commando Brigade (Hakkari)

References

Brigades of Turkey
Military in Mardin
Kızıltepe District
Mechanised brigades